The 1925–26 Tranmere Rovers F.C. season was the football team's fifth season in the Football League Third Division North. They finished 7th of 22 teams in the league, and reached the First Round of the FA Cup.

Football League

References 

Tranmere Rovers F.C. seasons